Long Knoll is a hill in the west of the English county of Wiltshire.

The hill is the site of the  Long Knoll biological Site of Special Scientific Interest, which was notified in 1971, and is part of the Cranborne Chase and West Wiltshire Downs Area of Outstanding Natural Beauty. Long Knoll is the most westerly part of the remains of a chalk plateau. It forms a ridge that runs east and west for about a mile, and is  higher than the surrounding land. The south-facing slope has a mosaic of longer and shorter turfs and has a mixture of grasses, sedges and forbs. Here grow a typical calcareous community including glaucus sedge, sheep’s-fescue, meadow oat-grass, heath-grass and common quaking-grass, together with cowslip, salad burnet, rock-rose, betony, small scabious and devil’s-bit scabious. Some of the less common chalk grassland herbs include clustered bellflower, early purple orchid, horseshoe vetch, kidney vetch and chalk milkwort.

The north-facing slope, by contrast, has more mosses and bryophytes on the closely grazed turf, with tufted hair-grass, false oat-grass, red fescue and crested hair-grass. Common valerian is an unusual species to find on chalk soils, and other herbs include autumn gentian, fairy flax and an abundance of devil’s-bit scabious.

Long Knoll is categorised as a Marilyn, a hill with topographic prominence of at least .

References

Sites of Special Scientific Interest in Wiltshire
Sites of Special Scientific Interest notified in 1971
Marilyns of England
Hills of Wiltshire